The 2008 Southern Nazarene Crimson Storm football team (variously "So-Naz", "SNU", or the "Crimson Storm") represents Southern Nazarene University in the college football season of 2008-2009. The team is led by head coach Mike Cochran, who has coached at SNU since 2006. They play their home games at McFarland Park Stadium in Bethany, Oklahoma. It was the first time in the history of the program, the Crimson Storm have opened the season 2-0. This will be SNU's longest season by 1 game, for the past 7 seasons the Crimson Storm have only played 10.

Schedule

Roster

Game summaries

Eastern New Mexico
The game was delayed about 2½ hours due to extreme lightning in the area. The stadium was cleared and the game was paused for at 11:11 minutes left in the third quarter until the storm cleared the area. SNU missed an extra point, and gave a safety to ENMU by a high snap that crossed out of the end zone.

Olivet Nazarene, Ill.
SNU won its second game of the season. Never have they started 2-0. There was no extra point tried for since the ONU touchdown happened at 0:00.

Mary Hardin-Baylor, Texas, 6:00 PM
Southern Nazarene University's road football game at Mary Hardin-Baylor in Belton, Texas, scheduled for Saturday at 6:00 p.m., has been moved up to Friday night, September 12 at 6:00 p.m. due to the approach of Hurricane Ike.

Oklahoma Panhandle State, 4:00 PM

Bacone, Okla., 7:00 PM

East Central, Okla., 2:00 PM

Bethel, Kan., 1:30 PM

Texas College, 2:00 PM

Northwestern Oklahoma State, 4:00 PM
This will be their homecoming game.

Langston, Okla., 2:00 PM

Southwestern Assemblies of God, Texas, 2:00pm
This will be senior night, and also the last home game of the season.

Rankings

Statistics

Team

Scores by quarter

Offense

Rushing

Passing

Receiving

Defense

Special teams

References

External links
Crimson Storm football

Southern Nazarene
Southern Nazarene Crimson Storm football seasons
Southern Nazarene Crimson Storm football